Dylan Dykes (born 14 March 1996) is a Scottish footballer who plays for West of Scotland team Pollok.

Career
Dykes played youth football with Rangers, signing a contract until the summer of 2016. He was released upon the expiration of his contract in May that year.

Dykes then signed for fellow Scottish Premiership side Ross County on 22 July 2016. He made his professional debut in a Highland derby against Inverness CT on 28 April 2017.

Having had limited first team opportunities at Ross County, Dykes joined League One club Stranraer in January 2018 on a development loan for the rest of the 2017–18 season.

Dykes left Ross County in January 2019 and signed for Greenock Morton. Dykes joined Stenhousemuir on loan before joining Cumbernauld Colts in February 2020.

Dykes agreed a move to West of Scotland team St Cadoc's in May 2020 before moving to Pollok two years later. He made his debut at home to Hurlford United in March, and scored his first goal from the penalty spot against Troon F.C. in a 2-1 win in April.

In October 2022, Pollok announced that Dykes had underwent treatment following a cancer diagnosis, triggering a wave of support from his former clubs and the wider footballing world.

Career statistics

References

External links

1996 births
Association football midfielders
Greenock Morton F.C. players
Living people
Rangers F.C. players
Ross County F.C. players
Scotland youth international footballers
West of Scotland Football League players
Scottish footballers
Scottish Professional Football League players
Stranraer F.C. players
Stenhousemuir F.C. players